Daniel Hora (born March 20, 1991) is a Czech professional ice hockey defenceman. He played with HC Litvínov in the Czech Extraliga during the 2010–11 Czech Extraliga season.

References

External links

1991 births
Czech ice hockey defencemen
HC Litvínov players
Living people
HC Most players
HC Stadion Litoměřice players
Czech expatriate ice hockey players in Germany